Lawrence K. "Larry" Mori (1948-2022) was a professional American bridge player from Charlton, New York. Mori was raised in Tokyo. He was a licensed psychotherapist, educated at Wayne State University and University of Michigan.

Bridge accomplishments

Wins

 North American Bridge Championships (5)
 Rockwell Mixed Pairs (1) 1992 
 Silodor Open Pairs (1) 1991 
 Keohane North American Swiss Teams (3) 1990, 2004, 2007

Runners-up

 North American Bridge Championships
 North American Pairs (1) 1979 
 Chicago Mixed Board-a-Match (1) 1997

Notes

Living people
American contract bridge players
1948 births
Place of birth missing (living people)
Date of birth missing (living people)
People from Tokyo
Wayne State University alumni
University of Michigan alumni
People from Charlton, New York